Jalil Anibaba (born October 19, 1988) is an American former professional soccer player who last played in Major League Soccer for Columbus Crew. He is currently a club ambassador for Nashville SC.

Career

College and amateur
Anibaba grew up in Davis, California where he attended Davis Senior High School, where in his senior season he was the California Gatorade Soccer Player of the year, and played college soccer at Santa Clara University for the first three years of his college career. In 2009, Anibaba captained the Broncos, who were selected for the National Soccer Coaches Association of America (NSCAA) All-West Region team.

For his senior season he transferred to the University of North Carolina, where he won numerous awards, including NSCAA Second Team All-America, NSCAA First Team All-Region, First Team All-ACC, ACC All-Tournament Team and 2007 WCC Freshman of the Year.

Anibaba made twelve appearances for USL Premier Development League club Carolina Dynamo during their 2010 season.

Professional
On January 14, 2011, Anibaba was drafted #9 overall in the 2011 MLS SuperDraft by the Chicago Fire. He made his professional debut on March 19, 2011, in Chicago's first game of the 2011 MLS season, a 1–1 tie with FC Dallas, and scored his first professional goal – a 40-yard screamer – on March 30, 2011 in a 2–1 victory over the Colorado Rapids in the qualifying round of the Lamar Hunt US Open Cup. Anibaba would go on to tally two more goals in the 2011 season finale, heading home two strikes in the space of 19 minutes in a 3–2 win vs. Columbus Crew on October 22, 2011. Anibaba closed out his first season in MLS setting a club record for regular season appearances by a rookie with 29 and had his March 30 strike vs. Colorado voted the team's "Goal of the Year" by the team's fans following the campaign.

After three seasons with Chicago, Anibaba was traded in January 2014 with the #8 pick in the 2014 MLS SuperDraft and a conditional third-round selection in the 2015 MLS SuperDraft to Seattle Sounders FC in exchange for the #13 pick in the 2014 SuperDraft, defender Jhon Kennedy Hurtado, and defender Patrick Ianni.

On December 10, 2014, Anibaba was selected by Orlando City SC with the fifth pick in the 2014 MLS Expansion Draft. After the draft, Anibaba was shipped to Sporting Kansas City as part of the trade for Aurelien Collin. Anibaba was dropped by Sporting Kansas City on November 25, 2015.

Anibaba was released by Kansas City at the end of the 2015 MLS season and later signed with the Houston Dynamo. His option was declined following the 2017 season; he signed with the New England Revolution in the 2018 preseason. Anibaba quickly became a fan-favorite in New England, partly due to his passionate celebrations following successful blocks and tackles. On March 30, 2019, Anibaba scored his only goal for the Revs in a 2–1 victory over Minnesota United FC.

On November 19, 2019, Anibaba was selected by MLS expansion side Nashville SC in the 2019 MLS Expansion Draft. Following the 2021 season Anibaba's contract expired with Nashville.

On January 14, 2022, Anibaba signed a 1-year deal as a free agent with Columbus Crew.

On Monday, February 13, Anibaba announced his retirement from professional soccer, after which he was named the first-ever club ambassador for Nashville SC.

Personal life 
Anibaba was born in the United States and is of Nigerian descent. His brother Jammil and cousin Sule played college soccer during the 2000s for the UC Davis Aggies, while half brother Josh Reese plays American football for UC Davis Aggies.

Career statistics

Club

References

External links
 
 
 U.S. soccer profile
 Tar Heels profile

1988 births
Living people
American people of Yoruba descent
American soccer players
American sportspeople of Nigerian descent
Association football defenders
North Carolina Fusion U23 players
Chicago Fire FC draft picks
Chicago Fire FC players
Columbus Crew players
Davis Senior High School (California) alumni
Footballers at the 2007 Pan American Games
Houston Dynamo FC players
Major League Soccer players
New England Revolution players
North Carolina Tar Heels men's soccer players
People from Davis, California
People from Fontana, California
Santa Clara Broncos men's soccer players
Seattle Sounders FC players
Soccer players from California
Sporting Kansas City players
United States men's under-20 international soccer players
United States men's youth international soccer players
USL League Two players
Yoruba sportspeople
Nashville SC players
Pan American Games competitors for the United States